Radiohjälpen is a Swedish help organisation and foundation that is organised by Sveriges Radio AB, Sveriges Television AB and Sveriges Utbildningsradio AB.

References

External links 
 
 About Radiohjälpen 

Foundations based in Sweden